Strassen is a commune and town in central Luxembourg. It is part of the canton of Luxembourg.

In 2016, Strassen's population counted 8500 citizens.
The current mayor of Strassen is Nico Pundel (CSV).

Populated places
The commune consists of the following villages:
 Strassen
 Reckenthal (lieu-dit) - partly shared with the city commune of Luxembourg

History 
Strassen was formed on 6 January 1851, when it was detached from the commune of Bertrange.  The law forming Strassen was passed on 6 August 1849.

The origins of the town began in Roman times. The name of Strassen comes from the Latin "strata," which means military road. In Roman times, the Roman road led from Trier through Arlon Strassen and Mamer upwards. Remains of the road were found in 1960 during the widening of Kiem Street. 
The seal of Johann Strassen (1411) and religious piety dating from 1500 (currently on display at the National Museum of the State), provided the basis for the municipal coat of arms created in 1976 and heraldic description of "Cloche d'or".

Due to a historical plague, one-third of the population of Strassen disappeared. With the cadastral maps during the time of Maria Theresia (1766) the area of Strassen was 2594.65 acres and the population was 417.

Strassen, along with some houses in Reckenthal, became a parish in 1804. In 1823 the town of Strassen was united with the town of Bertrange, but by a law of August 6, 1849, Strassen was again separated from Bertrange effective 1 January 1850. Thus it became a separate municipality from Reckenthal. At that time, the population consisted of 1300.

In 1850, natives of Luxembourg including some from Strassen, began to emigrate to the United States,  The emigrants from Luxembourg started experiencing a high death rate in the US, which discouraged further emigration.

In 1854 the national poet Michel Rodange married a citizen of Strassen, by the name of Leysen Magdalene and they moved to Fels where he was a teacher.

The first water main was laid in 1908.

For an entire century, the population did not change much. Strassen in 1946 had 1400 citizens and 332 houses. In 1960 there were 1900 inhabitants and 20 years later 4200.

Population

Urbanism 

Strassen is considered to be one of the smallest communes of the country.

Due to a strong increase of Luxembourg's population, new districts are seeing the day in Strassen. Strassen has been classified as the 3rd most expensive commune in Luxembourg. In fact, you have to count to spend on average  7 592 euro/m2 on recent real estate goods.
Strassen is also appreciated from the expatriates, given its proximity with Luxembourg City, and its quality of life.

As in many other communes in Luxembourg, Strassen has a private aquatic center (built in October 2009) named Les Thermes, with a cost of €35,000,000.
Luxembourg's national center of archery and the national center of martial arts are also located in Strassen.

Culture 

In September the biennial Stroossefestival takes part in central Strassen, with performances, food stalls, and attractions for all ages.

Transport 

Like elsewhere in the Grand Duchy of Luxembourg, public transport is effective and fast. There are buses (ecological hybrids) that connect to Luxembourg City.
Strassen has provided for its citizens, a city night shuttle bus service.

Education 

In the municipal area, there are 4 schools, all modern and well equipped.
In primary school, students lessons are in the three official languages of the country. The primary in Luxembourgish and the secondary language is German, while studying the prospect of having the second language cycle in French and the third language cycle in English.

Notable Person 
 Bernard of Luxemburg (d. 1535), Dominican theologian

References

External links

 Official website

 
Communes in Luxembourg (canton)
Towns in Luxembourg